Kenosha County Healthy Homes Initiative is a program through the Kenosha County Division of Health, United States, that focuses on creating safer and healthier environments.  The service is available to both homeowners and renters (with the landlord's permission).

Their focus is on improving air quality in homes with children who have asthma and allergies and preventing injuries in the residences of persons over 65 years of age.

Grant
The Healthy Homes program was made possible through a grant from the United States Department of Housing and Urban Development via a Healthy Homes Demonstration Program (HHD).  The grant allows the Healthy Homes program to address environmental triggers that contribute to illnesses, and conduct education and outreach that furthers the goal of protecting families from environmentally induced illnesses.

Healthy Homes principles
The program follows the National Center for Healthy Housing's seven principles of healthy homes, which include:
Dry: eliminate dampness and control moisture
Clean: regularly clean to reduce infestations and contaminants
Pest-Free: mice and cockroaches can cause asthma in children
Safe: falls (often caused by tripping) are the most common cause of residential injuries to persons over age 65
Contaminant-free: problems include lead, radon, pesticides, volatile organic compounds, and environmental tobacco smoke
Ventilated: fresh air supply improves respiratory health and can help prevent exposure to other indoor air pollutants
Maintained: poorly maintained homes often result in moisture problems and infestations

Asthma and allergy triggers
The focus of the program's grant is to identify and improve conditions that can aggravate asthma and allergies in the residents of the home, especially children.  Many of these problems are related to environmental triggers in the home.  The program checks for excess moisture and humidity levels, which can be caused by poor air flow or ventilation and create an atmosphere that allows mold or mildew to develop.  The program also checks the carbon monoxide and carbon dioxide levels for rooms, which provides more information about air flow and ventilation.  Factors they observe are tobacco smoke, dust mites, and pests, all of which can cause allergic reactions or trigger asthma attacks.  If any of these factors are determined to be a potential problem for anyone in the residence, the program will attempt to help resolve the issue.

Some actions taken by the program to improve air quality in homes enrolled in their program have been:
air filters for furnaces, which are purchased and installed
dehumidifiers purchased and installed to decrease the level of moisture
installation of smoke and carbon monoxide detectors
buying pest traps

The program also performs a test for radon gas, which is a naturally occurring radioactive and carcinogenic gas sometimes found at elevated levels in homes.  According to some studies, radon gas is the leading cause of lung cancer in non-smokers.

Fall hazards
For people over the age of 65, the Healthy Homes Initiative looks for situations that are considered "fall hazards".  Examples are broken or missing steps or railings, poor lighting, clutter, and unsafe rugs or carpets.

Some solutions for problems include:
purchase and installation of energy efficient light bulbs to increase visibility
purchase and installation of grab bars for toilets and showers
installation of railings in stairwells
providing fire extinguishers

References

Kenosha County, Wisconsin